The University of Engineering, Arts, Science and Technology or University of EAST is a private university in Hyderabad, Sindh, Pakistan.
The University was granted Charter under University of East Act 1999 by Sindh Legislature and established in August 2004.

Introduction
The University is handled by a group of devoted professional and academics who have committed their lives to the cause of higher education in Pakistan since its origination in 1999. The University committed to improving the quality of business and technical education in Pakistan. By providing facilities for personal and professional growth of individuals who wish to make a career in the fields of business, science and technology through many teaching programs.

Departments
University of EAST consists of eleven departments.
 Business Administration
 computer sciences
 Education
 English
 Electrical Technology
 Information Technology
 Law
 Mechanical technology
 Media Sciences
 Textile Management
 Urdu

References 

www.apkidunya.com

External links 

Private universities and colleges in Pakistan
Private universities and colleges in Sindh
Educational institutions established in 2004
2004 establishments in Pakistan
Hyderabad District, Pakistan
Universities and colleges in Hyderabad District, Pakistan